Raworth is a surname. Notable people with the surname include:

 Alfred Raworth (1882–1967), electrical engineer to the Southern Railway (Great Britain) in the 1940s
 Kate Raworth (born 1970), British economist
 Sophie Raworth (born 1968), English newsreader and journalist
 Tom Raworth (1938–2017), British poet and visual artist